David George Walter (born May 6, 1952) is a Canadian former professional ice hockey centre. Between 1973 and 1976, Walter played 26 games in the World Hockey Association with the Chicago Cougars and San Diego Mariners.

Career statistics

References

External links

1952 births
Living people
Binghamton Dusters players
Brantford Alexanders players
Canadian ice hockey centres
Chicago Cougars players
Hampton Aces players
Ice hockey people from Ontario
Long Island Cougars players
Niagara Falls Flyers players
Rhode Island Eagles players
San Diego Mariners players
Sportspeople from Niagara Falls, Ontario
Tucson Mavericks players
Utica Mohawks players